The Road: Winter for Spring is a Korean-language single album by South Korean boy band Super Junior, released on February 28, 2022. The single album features the vocals of nine Super Junior members, which are Leeteuk, Heechul, Yesung, Shindong, Eunhyuk, Donghae, Siwon, Ryeowook and Kyuhyun.

Background 
On February 14, 2022, the group released a promotional image for the single album. On February 16, 2022, the group announced that they would release it on February 28, 2022. The behind-the-scenes of the music video for the lead single, "Callin'", was released on Super Junior's official YouTube channel on March 2, 2022.

Promotion 
The group held a live event on their official YouTube channel on March 1, 2022. They performed the lead single, "Callin'", on M Countdown on March 3, 2022, marking their comeback. They also made appearances on Music Core and Inkigayo.

Track listing

Charts

Weekly charts

Year-end charts

References

SM Entertainment singles
Super Junior albums
2022 singles